Hebgen Dam is a concrete-core earthen embankment dam in the western United States, located on the Madison River in southwestern Montana. Montana Power Company originally built the dam, PPL Corporation purchased it in 1997 and sold it to NorthWestern Corporation in 2014.

History 
Hebgen Dam was built across the Madison River in 1914 by Montana Power Company to create Hebgen Lake. 

During the 7.5 magnitude 1959 Hebgen Lake earthquake in mid-August, the dam was damaged, primarily because of such intense ground movement that water surged over the dam crest four different times, but it was fixed several weeks later. The epicenter of the quake was determined to be  beneath the bottom of Hebgen Lake. Seismologists reported it to be the fourth largest quake recorded in the United States up to that time. 

See also
1959 Hebgen Lake earthquake

References

External links
 "Yellowstone earthquake at the Madison River." Tuholske, Lily. "Yellowstone Earthquake at the Madison River." Distinctly Montana. September 9, 1998. Accessed March 18, 2018.

Dams in Montana
Buildings and structures in Gallatin County, Montana
Earth-filled dams
NorthWestern Corporation dams
Dams completed in 1914